The 2022–23 Moldovan Liga 1 is the 32nd season of Moldovan football's second-tier league. The season started on 26 August 2022 and will conclude on 10 May 2023.

Teams

Phase I

Group A

Group B

Phase II

Group 1

Group 2

References

External links
Divizia A - Moldova - Results, fixtures, tables and news - divizia-a.md

Moldovan Liga 1 seasons
Moldova 2
2022–23 in Moldovan football
Current association football seasons